The 2014 WNBA season will be the 18th season for the Los Angeles Sparks of the Women's National Basketball Association.

Ownership Change
At the end of 2013, the Sparks' previous ownership group announced it was ceasing operation and transferring the team to the WNBA. The league, led by commissioner Laurel Richie, began to search for a new owner. The owners of the Golden State Warriors expressed interest in purchasing the team and moving it to the San Francisco area, but ultimately the team was sold to Guggenheim Partners, which also owns the Los Angeles Dodgers, ensuring the Sparks would remain in Los Angeles. The new owners include former Los Angeles Lakers star Magic Johnson.

Roster

Awards and honors

References

External links

Los Angeles Sparks seasons
Los Angeles
Los Angeles Sparks